The National Democratic Coalition may refer to:
National Democratic Coalition (Ecuador)
National Democratic Coalition (Iraq)
National Democratic Coalition (Liberia)
National Democratic Coalition (Nigeria)